Hamed Sohrabnejad (born May 7, 1983 in Sanandaj, Iran)  is a professional Iranian basketball player who plays for Mahram of the Iranian Super League and also the Iranian national basketball team. He is 6'9" in height.

Honours

National team
Asian Championship
Gold medal: 2009, 2013
Asian Games
Bronze medal: 2010
Islamic Solidarity Games
Bronze medal: 2005

Club
Asian Championship
Gold medal: 2009, 2010 (Mahram)
West Asian Championship
Gold medal: 2009 (Mahram)
Iranian Basketball Super League
Champions: 2008, 2009 (Mahram)

References

External links
 RealGM profile

Living people
1983 births
Asian Games bronze medalists for Iran
Asian Games medalists in basketball
Basketball players at the 2008 Summer Olympics
Basketball players at the 2010 Asian Games
Iranian men's basketball players
Mahram Tehran BC players
Medalists at the 2010 Asian Games
Olympic basketball players of Iran
Petrochimi Bandar Imam BC players
Power forwards (basketball)
People from Sanandaj
Islamic Solidarity Games competitors for Iran